= John D. Shackelford =

American lawyer and politician

John D. Shackelford (also spelled Shackleford) was an American lawyer and state legislator in Arkansas. He served in the Arkansas Senate in 1913.
